Spirit Lake is a lake in Price County, Wisconsin and Taylor County, Wisconsin that is the source of the Spirit River.  It is contiguous and at the same elevation as North Spirit Lake, connected by a narrow channel.  The lake features a number of species of recreational fish including muskellunge, panfish, largemouth bass, northern pike and walleye.

In 1982 the non-profit Spirit Lakes Improvement Association was established for the purpose of improving the general quality of Spirit Lake and North Spirit Lake.

References

External links
 
 

Lakes of Wisconsin
Bodies of water of Price County, Wisconsin
Bodies of water of Taylor County, Wisconsin